is a Japanese light novel series written by FUNA. The series originated on the Shōsetsuka ni Narō website, before being published in print with illustrations by Sukima by Kodansha beginning in June 2017. As of March 2023, nine volumes have been released. A manga adaptation, illustrated by Hibiki Kokonoe, was on the Niconico-based Suiyōbi no Sirius platform in June 2017 to January 2022, with its individual chapters collected into nine volumes. A sequel manga, illustrated by Futsū Onshin, began serialization on the same platform in August 2022. As of March 2023, the manga's individual chapters have been collected into a single volume. An anime television series adaptation is set to premiere in 2023.

Characters
/

Media

Light novel
Written by FUNA, the series began serialization on the novel posting website Shōsetsuka ni Narō on November 3, 2015. The series was later acquired by Kodansha, who began publishing the series in print with illustrations by Sukima on June 1, 2017. As of March 2023, nine volumes have been released.

In December 2018, J-Novel Club announced that they licensed the novels for English publication.

Volume list

Manga
A manga adaptation, illustrated by Hibiki Kokonoe, was serialized on the Niconico-based Suiyōbi no Sirius platform from June 7, 2017 to January 2022. Kodansha published the individual chapters in nine tankōbon volumes. A sequel to the manga adaptation illustrated by Futsū Onshin, titled I Shall Survive Using Potions! Continuation, began serialization on the same platform on August 1, 2022. As of March 2023, the series' individual chapters have been collected into a single tankōbon volume.

In December 2018, J-Novel Club announced that they also licensed the manga adaptation for English publication.

A spin-off manga also illustrated by Sukima, titled I Shall Survive Using Potions! Hanano and Lotte's Journey, also began serialization on Suiyōbi no Sirius on January 30, 2023.

Volume list

First series

Second series

Anime
An anime television series adaptation was announced on February 24, 2023. It is set to premiere in 2023.

Reception

Amazon removal
In July 2020, the series' light novel and manga adaptation were among several series temporarily removed from Amazon; Amazon stated that the affected series "did not fall within their global content guidelines."

See also
 Didn't I Say to Make My Abilities Average in the Next Life?!, another light novel series by FUNA
 Saving 80,000 Gold in Another World for My Retirement, another light novel series by FUNA

References

External links
  
  
 

2017 Japanese novels
Anime and manga based on light novels
Isekai anime and manga
Isekai novels and light novels
J-Novel Club books
Japanese webcomics
Kodansha books
Kodansha manga
Light novels
Light novels first published online
Shōnen manga
Shōsetsuka ni Narō
Upcoming anime television series
Webcomics in print